Souq.com was the largest e-commerce platform in the Arab world. The company launched in 2005 in Dubai, United Arab Emirates. On March 28, 2017, Amazon.com Inc. acquired Souq.com for $580 million as a subsidiary. On May 1, 2019, Souq.com UAE became known as Amazon.ae, while on June 17, 2020, Souq.com KSA became known as Amazon.sa. Lastly, on September 1 2021, Souq.com Egypt became known as Amazon.eg and officially marking the end of Souq.com, however some blog posts, pages, and the Sign In/Log In Page have not been changed to Amazon so they are the last remaining pages of Souq.com.

History
The website was founded in 2005 by Ronaldo Mouchawar and was originally a consumer to consumer auction site part of Maktoob Group. In 2010, Wisam (Sam) Daoud joined Souq from eBay as Chief Technology Officer and led the transformation of the business from auctions to a fixed price catalog based business similar to Amazon.com. In late 2012 Asif Keshodia joined as CFO on the heel of Souq's first major funding round led by Cape Town, South Africa-based Naspers and NYC hedge fund Tiger Global Management.

In March 2014, Naspers invested another $75 million in the company, bringing to $150 million the total Souq.com raised since its inception, the largest amount raised by any internet-based business in the Middle East.

The company was backed by Tiger Global Management and Naspers Ltd. as of 2015, among other companies, and headquartered in Dubai. In October 2015, it was reported that in a round of fundraising, the company was valued at around $1 billion. At the time, it had around 10 million visitors monthly in the 2nd place after Digikala by 51 million visitors monthly.

On March 27, 2017, Emaar Properties made an offer for Souq of $800 million. On March 28, 2017, Amazon.com Inc. confirmed it would be acquiring Souq.com for an unknown value. A source told The Wall Street Journal the deal was worth around $700 million,  while the Financial Times reported that the deal was "understood to be worth more than $650m". The BBC also reported that Amazon might be paying about $650 million. The deal was expected to be completed later in 2017.

With the acquisition, Souq.com is now a subsidiary of Amazon, acting as Amazon's arm into the Arab world. In May 2019, Souq.com UAE became Amazon.ae, in September of the same year Amazon launched the Amazon DSP in the UAE and in June 2020, Souq.com KSA become amazon.sa and in September 1, 2021 Souq.com Egypt became amazon.eg and officially marking the end of Souq.com.

Overview
As of March 2017, it sold over 8.4 million products in 31 categories, including "consumer electronics, fashion, health and beauty, household goods and baby." It also had around 45 million visits per month. It was the largest e-commerce platform in the Arab world as of 2016, often described as the Amazon of the Middle East. As of 2014, the site delivered to the United Arab Emirates, Saudi Arabia, Kuwait, Egypt, Bahrain, Oman, and Qatar.

By March 2017, Souq.com had localized operations in Saudi Arabia, United Arab Emirates and Egypt, which as of 2014 equated to semi-automated modern fulfillment centers in the United Arab Emirates, Saudi Arabia, Kuwait, and Egypt, measuring a total of 35,000 square meters. At the time the company had employed around 2,500 employees in engineering, retail, customer support, fulfillment and last mile delivery sections.

As of September 1, 2021, Souq.com has been completely replaced by Amazon as Egypt replaces Souq.com Egypt with Amazon.eg.

Souq.com subsidiaries
As of January 2018, Souq.com subsidiaries include their delivery arm – QExpress, payment platform – Payfort which became Amazon Pay in Dec 2020, repair and service marketplace – Helpbit, and delivery marketplace Wing.

See also

Noon
Icflix
Yahoo! Maktoob
InFocus
Jumia

References

Further reading
 Sign Up/Log In to Souq.com

External links 
 
 
 

Internet properties established in 2005
Online retailers of the United Arab Emirates
Retail companies established in 2005
Amazon (company) acquisitions
Maktoob
Emirati companies established in 2005
Companies based in Dubai
Online retailers of Saudi Arabia